Carlos Kenny (born 19 July 1950) is an Argentine field hockey player. He competed in the men's tournament at the 1968 Summer Olympics.

References

External links
 

1950 births
Living people
Argentine male field hockey players
Olympic field hockey players of Argentina
Field hockey players at the 1968 Summer Olympics
Field hockey players from Buenos Aires